The Stoat is a 1940 mystery detective novel by the Irish-born writer Lynn Brock. It was the seventh and last novel in his series featuring the character of the Golden Age detective Colonel Wyckham Gore. It was also his last published work before his death three years later. It marked a return for Gore, who hadn't appeared in a novel since 1930.

Synopsis
Gore's assistance is sought by his old army colleague Colonel Margesson, who has having difficulties with his wife and children. When not only Margesson but his two children are killed, the case proves baffling until a visit to Ireland reveals the explanation.

References

Bibliography
 Keating, Henry Reymond Fitzwalter. Whodunit?: A Guide to Crime, Suspense, and Spy Fiction. Van Nostrand Reinhold Company, 1982.
 Reilly, John M. Twentieth Century Crime & Mystery Writers. Springer, 2015.

1940 British novels
British mystery novels
British thriller novels
Novels by Lynn Brock
Novels set in England
Novels set in Ireland
British detective novels
Collins Crime Club books